Han Min-kyu (born 31 March 1973) is a South Korean former professional tennis player.

With a career high singles world ranking of 742, Han featured mainly at satellite/Futures level and outside of tennis was a student at Soonchunhyang University.

Han made his only ATP Tour main draw appearance as a wildcard at the 1996 Korea Open in Seoul and was beaten in the first round by Italy's Gianluca Pozzi.

ITF Futures titles

Doubles: (1)

References

External links
 
 

1973 births
Living people
South Korean male tennis players
20th-century South Korean people